Taylor Luvambo (born 5 July 1999) is a French professional footballer who plays as a winger for Guingamp.

Career
Luvambo is a product of the youth academies of Racing Paris, FC Asnières, Paris Saint-Germain and Nantes. He began his career with the reserves of Nantes, before moving to Fleury for the 2020-21 season. He moved to the reserves of Guingamp in the summer of 2021, scoring 10 goals in 26 appearances in his debut season with them. On 10 June 2022, he signed a professional contract with Guignamp for 2 years. He made his senior debut with Guingamp in a 4–0 Ligue 2 win over Pau FC on 28 July 2022, and made 2 assists as he started the game.

International career
Born in France, Luvambo is of Congolese descent. He is a youth international for France, having represented the France U18s in 2017.

References

External links
 
 FFF Profile

1999 births
Living people
Sportspeople from Saint-Denis, Seine-Saint-Denis
French footballers
France youth international footballers
French sportspeople of Democratic Republic of the Congo descent
FC Nantes players
FC Fleury 91 players
En Avant Guingamp players
Ligue 2 players
Championnat National 2 players
Association football wingers